Khadim Hussain Raja (b. Haranpur, Jhelum District, British India 1922/11/23; d. 1999/12/09, Islamabad, Pakistan) was a Pakistani army officer who attained the rank of Major General. He was the General Officer Commanding of 14 Division during the Bangladesh Liberation War.

Maj Gen Raja was in charge of military operation of March 25, 1971. Other generals were present in Dhaka along with Yahya Khan, and secretly departed on the evening of March 25, 1971, that fateful day after fixing the deadline for the military action. Lt Gen Tikka Khan, Maj Gen Rao Farman Ali and Maj Gen Khadim Hussain Raja were associated with the planning of the military action. Eventually their action bloodied the capital city Dhaka with the blood of thousands of residents including students, military and police personnel, politician and the general mass. Later documents regarding their action on the early hours of 26 March 1971 known as Operation Searchlight was revealed to the world. He wrote a book, A Stranger in My Own Country: East Pakistan, 1969-71 (Oxford University Press, 2012), in which he revealed secrets about the nine-month liberation war of Bangladesh.

The Mukti Bahini's (under M. A. G. Osmani) initial success in capturing a portable radio-transmitter near Rangamati was short-lived due to Raja's accidental discovery of the transmitter—he had authorised a search for it, and directed it from his personal helicopter through radio-contact when it was fired-upon.

References

External links 
An Atlas of the 1971 India - Pakistan War: The Creation of Bangladesh by John H. Gill

1922 births
1999 deaths
People from Jhelum District
Pakistani writers
Pakistani generals
Pakistani military personnel of the Indo-Pakistani War of 1971